Nila Madhab Panda (born 18 October 1973) is an Indian film producer and director. Panda has directed and produced over 70 films, documentaries, and shorts based on social issues such as climate change, child labor, education, water issues, sanitation and other developmental issues in India. Many of his films are based on his own experiences. He has won several awards and received critical acclaim for his films which have been described as "entertaining yet socially relevant."

Early life 
Panda, an Indian filmmaker and entrepreneur, was born in Dasharajpur Village, located in the Subarnapur District of Western Odisha, India. As the youngest of five siblings, Panda's education in a rural village posed challenges due to the lack of a proper school building, forcing him to walk 4-9 km daily to get to school. In 1995, after failing to complete his education, Panda relocated to Delhi and found work as a camera attendant. It was in this role that he began to gain expertise in the complexities of filmmaking. According to some sources, Panda also studied Entrepreneurship at IIM Bangalore.

Career 
Nila Madhab Panda is an Odia director and producer involved in making mainstream and parallel Hindi films, documentaries, short films and public service advertising campaigns. He has served on the juries of national and international film festivals, such as International Film Festival of India (IFFI). He started his career by assisting director Robin Romanov and producer Barbara Broccoli.

His first feature film I Am Kalam became an iconic film winning 34 international awards along with a national award. His second feature film Jalpari (Desert Mermaid) received the MIP Junior award at Cannes. He continued making path breaking films like Babloo Happy Hai (Babloo is happy) and Kaun Kitne Paani Mein (In troubled water). His project Kadvi Hawa (Dark wind) was highly rated and critically acclaimed globally and received a national award. This is one of the first films that brought climate change into Indian cinema. His feature-length documentary God's own people narrated by Amitabh Bachchan connects between people's faith with tree and God.

Halkaa (Relief) was his production - a musical film with children. The film narrates a story about the Swachhata Abhiyaan (Clean India Mission) and the importance of sanitation. It won Best Film at the Grand Prix in Poland. In February 2021, Panda announced that his First Odia language film Kalira Atita had been submitted to the Oscars 2021 in the General Category and was available for Academy screening. However, the film did not make the cut for Oscar nominations.

Direction

Feature films

Film awards 
 Jalpari won MIP Junior award for best film, 2012, Cannes
 Viewers' Choice award at IFFLA, 2011
 Best Feature Film (I am Kalam) in Chicago International Children's Film Festival, 2011
 People's Choice Award at the Montreal International Children's Film Festival, 2011
 Best Feature Film award at Silent River Film Festival (SRFF), California, 2011
 Best Director award at Silent River Film Festival (SRFF), California, 2011
 Winner of the Don Quixote Prize of the International Cine Club Federations at the Lucas International Film Festival, Germany, 2010
 Winner of "Best feature film" at the Lucas International Film Festival, Frankfurt 2010
 "Special Jury mention" CineKid International Film Festivals 2010
 "International Jury's Special Mention" at the Ale Kino International Film Festival, Poland 2010
 Bronze Cairo for Best Feature at Cairo International Film Festival for Children, Cairo, 2012
 The Prize of the International Center of Films For Children & Young People (CIFEJ) at the Cairo International Film Festival for Children, Cairo, 2012
 Winner of "Best feature film" from the Indian Panorama by the Young Jury at the 41st International, Film Festival of India 2010
 Best Debut Director – Aravindam Purashkaram, 2011
 Golden Elephant Award for the Best Screenplay at 17th International Children's Film Festival, India,2011
 Best Feature Film in CMS International Film Festival, 2011
 "Audience Favorite choice" at the Barbican London Children Film Festival 2010
 Audience Favorite at Barbican London Children's Film Festival, 2011
 Best Feature Film, Dream Fest – Slatina, 2012
 Best Film (Halkaa) at the Grand Prix in Poland, 2018

Other awards and recognition 
 Padma Shri, 2016
 British Council - Creative Futures of India 2006 (Longest Journey award)
 UK Environment Film Fellowship 2005
 Heroism in Cinematography, 2003 THP, New York
 "Excellence in media" for fighting the cause female foeticide
 United Nations Visual Media fellowship 2002
 "Odisha icon" 2011
 "Living Legend" 2012
 "Son of Odisha" 2012
 "Bharat Gaurav (India's pride)" 2015
 Asia Pacific entrepreneurship award
 Karmaveer Purasakar
 2021 - Jury member at 52nd International Film Festival of India, Goa 2021

References

External links 
 
 
 Smile Foundation India

1973 births
Living people
People from Subarnapur district
Recipients of the Padma Shri in arts
Hindi-language film directors
Film directors from Odisha
Film producers from Odisha
Indian Institute of Management Bangalore alumni